Amos Parker Wilder (February 15, 1862 – July 2, 1936) was an American journalist and diplomat who served as United States Consul General to Hong Kong and Shanghai in the early 20th century.

Early life and education
Wilder was born on September 10, 1861 in Calais, Maine, the son of Amos Wilder and Charlotte P. Wilder. He earned an A.B. and Ph.D from Yale University.

Career 
From 1882 to 1892 he edited the New Haven Palladium, and from 1892 to 1894, worked as an editorial writer in New York City. In 1894, he moved to Wisconsin, where he purchased a one-half interest in the Wisconsin State Journal, and in 1901 acquired controlling interest.

Wilder was a devout Congregationalist and served as a church deacon. He was also and teetotaler and temperance advocate from his youth. He was in favor of women's suffrage.

In 1906, Wilder was appointed United States Consul General in Hong Kong and in 1909 transferred to be United States Consul General in Shanghai, serving until 1914.

In Shanghai, given his views on alcohol, he refused to help an American brewery enter the Chinese market on moral grounds stating he was willing to resign his position.

After returning to the United States, Wilder spent the remainder of his life in the north east of the country, holding various important positions. From 1921 to 1929 was associate editor of the New Haven Journal Courier. He was also head of the Yale-China Program.

Family

Wilder married Isabella Thornton Niven. They had six children: Amos Wilder, a theologian and poet; Thornton Wilder, a writer; Charlotte Wilder, a poet and professor of English; Isabel Wilder, a novelist; and Janet Wilder Dakin, an author and professor of biology. A twin brother of Thornton Wilder died at birth.

Death
Wilder died on July 2, 1936, in New Haven, Connecticut and was buried at Mount Carmel Cemetery in Hamden, Connecticut.

References

External links
 Photograph of Wilder with Wu Ting Fang
 Portrait of Wilder
 Wilder with his family circa 1906

1861 births
1936 deaths
American diplomats
Consuls general of the United States in Shanghai
Consuls general of the United States in Hong Kong and Macau